David J. Ward (born 10 October 1948, in London) is a British palaeontologist.

He worked for 14 years as a veterinary surgeon while being an amateur palaeontologist and taking part in several expeditions to Africa. In 1988 he retired from medicine to devote himself completely to palaeontology. He travelled extensively in Europe, Africa, Australia, and the Americas, as well as to Uzbekistan, Russia and Kazakhstan.

He published over 50 scientific articles and co-authored a bestselling book, Fossils (Smithsonian Handbook series).

He was the 2007 Skinner Award recipient.

References

1948 births
Living people
British palaeontologists
Amateur paleontologists